John Herman "Dutch" Rudolph (July 10, 1882 – April 17, 1967) was an outfielder in Major League Baseball. He played for the Philadelphia Phillies and Chicago Cubs.

External links

1882 births
1967 deaths
Major League Baseball outfielders
Philadelphia Phillies players
Chicago Cubs players
Uniontown Coal Barons players
East Liverpool (minor league baseball) players
Zanesville Moguls players
Marion Moguls players
New Castle Outlaws players
Altoona Rams players
Reading Pretzels players
Allentown (minor league baseball) players
Harrisburg Senators players
Baseball players from Pennsylvania